Pajusalu is an Estonian surname. Notable people with the surname include:
Kaisa Pajusalu (born 1989), Estonian rower
Raimo Pajusalu (born 1981), Estonian volleyball player
Karl Pajusalu (born 1963), Estonian linguist
Renate Pajusalu (born 1963), Estonian linguist

Estonian-language surnames